Nutley is a small village and civil parish in the Basingstoke and Deane district of Hampshire, England.

Governance
The village of Nutley is part of the civil parish of Nutley, which is part of the parish council of Preston Candover and Nutley. It is also part of the Upton Grey and the Candovers ward of Basingstoke and Deane borough council. The borough council is a Non-metropolitan district of Hampshire County Council.

References

Villages in Hampshire
Civil parishes in Basingstoke and Deane